Jackson County School System (JCSS) is a school district in Jackson County, Georgia, United States, based in Jefferson. It serves the communities of Arcade, Athens, Braselton, Commerce, Hoschton, Jefferson, Maysville, Nicholson, Pendergrass, and Talmo. It is run by the Jackson County Schools Board of Education along with superintendent Dr. April Howard.

Board of education
The JCSS Board of Education considers and approves the policies that govern Jackson County Schools. The board consists of five members, representing five geographical districts, who are elected per district to represent their district's constituents for a four-year term. As with every Board of Education in the state of Georgia, the JCSS Board of Education elects their own chair and vice-chair. The Superintendent of Jackson County Schools also sits on the JCSS Board of Education.

Monthly board meetings
Board members meet twice monthly for two types of meetings. The first meeting of the month is called the Board Work Session, during which specifics of the Board of Education Meeting are initially shared and discussed. The second meeting of the month follows the Work Session and is called the Board of Education Meeting.

The Board of Education Meeting is held every second Monday of the month (unless otherwise noted), and the Board of Education Work Sessions are held the Thursday prior.  Meetings are open to the public (unless otherwise noted) with openly accessible agendas hosted on the JCSS Board of Education eBoard/Simbli website.

Both the Board of Education work sessions and regular meetings are broadcast live.

Board of Education members
 District 1 - Rob Johnson
 District 2 - Carol Anglin
 District 3 - Beau Hollett
 District 4 - Lynne Massey-Wheeler (Vice-Chair)
 District 5 - Don Clerici (Chair)
 School Superintendent - Dr. April Howard

Schools
The Jackson County School System has six elementary schools, two middle schools, two high schools, and one charter school that was scheduled to open in August 2021.

However, starting in the fall of 2021, Jackson County School System will be adding an eleventh school to the district. On January 31, 2019, Jackson County Schools broke ground on a new high school building for Jackson County Comprehensive High School, expected to open for the 2021-2021 school year. Once the new high school opens, the former Jackson County High School campus will be converted to the Empower College and Career Center, a charter high school that will serve students from the Jackson County School District and the Commerce City School District.

Elementary schools
 East Jackson Elementary School
 Gum Springs Elementary School
 Maysville Elementary School
 North Jackson Elementary School
 South Jackson Elementary School
 West Jackson Elementary School

Middle schools
 East Jackson Middle School
 West Jackson Middle School

High schools
East Jackson Comprehensive High School
Jackson County Comprehensive High School

Charter schools
 EMPOWER College and Career Center

References

External links

JCSS Live: Jackson County Schools YouTube channel
JCSS eBoard/Simbli website
Jackson County Schools Board of Education

Education in Jackson County, Georgia
School districts in Georgia (U.S. state)
Buildings and structures in Jackson County, Georgia
Jackson
School districts established in 1914
1914 establishments in Georgia (U.S. state)